The 2017–18 Boise State Broncos women's basketball team represents Boise State University during the 2017–18 NCAA Division I women's basketball season. The Broncos, led by 13th-year head coach Gordy Presnell, play their home games at Taco Bell Arena as a member of the Mountain West Conference. They finished the season 23–10, 14–4 in Mountain West play to win the Mountain West regular season title with UNLV. They were also champions of the Mountain West women's tournament and earn an automatic trip to the NCAA women's tournament where they lost in the first round to Louisville.

Roster

Schedule

|-
!colspan=9 style=""| Exhibition

|-
!colspan=9 style=""| Non-conference regular season

|-
!colspan=9 style=""| Mountain West regular season

|-
!colspan=9 style=""| Mountain West Women's Tournament

|-
!colspan=9 style=""| NCAA Women's Tournament

Rankings
2017–18 NCAA Division I women's basketball rankings

See also
2017–18 Boise State Broncos men's basketball team

References

Boise State Broncos women's basketball seasons
Boise State
Boise
Boise
Boise State